Brodie is a given name and a surname.

Brodie may also refer to:

Places
 Brodie Castle, Scotland
 Brodie railway station, a former station in Moray, Scotland
 Brodie Mountain, Massachusetts, United States
 Brodie Mountain (ski area), an alpine ski area in Massachusetts
 Brodie, Ontario, one of the urban neighbourhoods of Sudbury, Ontario, Canada

Other uses
 Clan Brodie, a Scottish clan
 Brodie baronets
 Brodie Bicycles, a Canadian bicycle manufacturer
 Brodies, Scottish law firm
 Brodie helmet, military helmet
 Brodie knob, attached to an automobile steering wheel
 Brodie landing system for airplanes
 Brodie abscess, medical term
 Brodie's Law (act), Legislation
 Brodie's Law, comic book

See also
 Brody (disambiguation)
 Brodiaea, genus of flower (cluster-lily), named after James Brodie
 Archaeoniscus Brodiei, Jurassic isopod named after Peter Bellinger Brodie